Joseph A. Kuczkowski is a Goodyear scientist, noted for successfully explaining the mechanisms of antioxidant and antiozonant function, and for commercial development of new antiozonant systems and improvement of the stability of polymeric materials.

Education

 1963 - BS Chemistry, Canisius College, Buffalo, New York
 1966 - MS Chemistry, Canisius College, Buffalo, New York
 1968 - Ph.D. Organic Chemistry, Wayne State University, Detroit, Michigan, supervised by Prof. Michael Cava
 1971 - postdoctoral fellow under Prof. Adam M. Aguiar in organo-phosphorus chemistry

Career

 1968-1970 - U.S. Army Medical Service Corps, responsible for Clinical Chemistry Department of the 6th US Army Medical Laboratory
 1971 - jointed Goodyear Tire & Rubber Company as a Senior Research Chemist
 1977 - Section Head, exploratory products and processes
 1982 - Section Head, Rubber Chemicals
 1984 - Section Head, Rubber Chemicals & Hydroquinone
 1988 - R&D Associate, Chemicals and Specialty Polymers
 2001 - retired from Goodyear

Kuczkowsi holds 23 US patents.  Of these, 12 are products or processes in production, including:  Wingstay SN and Wingstay K.

Awards

 2000 - Melvin Mooney Award of the Rubber Division of the American Chemical Society.
 2011 - Charles Goodyear Medal of the Rubber Division of the American Chemical Society.

References

Living people
Polymer scientists and engineers
21st-century American engineers
Year of birth missing (living people)
Tire industry people
Goodyear Tire and Rubber Company people‎